Heinrich Carl Friedrich Kreutz (September 8, 1854 – July 13, 1907) was a German astronomer, most notable for his studies of the orbits of several sungrazing comets, which revealed that they were all related objects, produced when a very large sun-grazing comet fragmented several hundred years previously.  The group is now known as the Kreutz Sungrazers, and has produced some of the brightest comets ever seen.

Kreutz was born in Siegen in 1854, and obtained his PhD at the University of Bonn in 1880 on the orbit of comet C/1861 J1.  In 1882 he moved to Kiel, working at the observatory and university there.  In 1896 he became the editor of the Astronomische Nachrichten, the leading astronomical journal of the time, and held the position until his death in 1907.

The minor planet 3635 Kreutz, discovered by Luboš Kohoutek in 1981, was named after him.

References

Bibliography

 Obituary - 1907, Publications of the Astronomical Society of the Pacific, v. 19, p. 248

External links
 Biography from SEDS

1854 births
1907 deaths
People from Siegen
People from the Province of Westphalia
19th-century German astronomers
University of Bonn alumni
20th-century German astronomers